The Carolina Hurricanes are an American professional ice hockey team based in Raleigh, North Carolina. They play in the Metropolitan Division of the Eastern Conference in the National Hockey League (NHL). The team joined the NHL in 1979 as an expansion team as the Hartford Whalers, but moved to Raleigh, North Carolina in 1997. The Hurricanes won their first Stanley Cup championship in 2006. Having first played at the Greensboro Coliseum, the Hurricanes have played their home games at the PNC Arena, which was first named the Raleigh Entertainment & Sports Arena, since 1999. The Hurricanes are owned by Tom Dundon and Don Waddell is their general manager.

There have been five head coaches for the Hurricanes team. The team's first head coach was Paul Maurice, who has coached for six seasons. Maurice is the team's all-time leader for the most regular-season games coached, regular-season game wins, regular-season points, playoff games coached and playoff-game wins. Peter Laviolette is the only coach to have won the Stanley Cup with the Hurricanes in the 2006 Stanley Cup Finals. None of the Hurricanes coaches have been elected into the Hockey Hall of Fame as a builder. Maurice was the head coach of the Hurricanes since the firing of Laviolette, but was replaced by Kirk Muller on November 28, 2011. Muller was relieved of coaching duties on May 5, 2014. On June 19, 2014, the Hurricanes named Bill Peters their head coach, who decided to opt out of his contract following the 2017-18 season. On May 8, 2018, the Hurricanes named assistant coach and former team captain Rod Brind'Amour as the head coach for the 2018-19 season.

Key

Coaches
Note: Statistics are correct through the 2021-22 season.

Notes
 A running total of the number of coaches of the Hurricanes. Thus, any coach who has two or more separate terms as head coach is only counted once.
 Before the 2005–06 season, the NHL instituted a penalty shootout for regular season games that remained tied after a five-minute overtime period, which prevented ties.
Each year is linked to an article about that particular NHL season.

References
General

Specific

       
coaches
Carolina Hurricanes head coaches